Ann Maurice (born November 11, 1951) is an American interior designer and house stager perhaps best known in the UK as Channel 5's "House Doctor". She also hosted two series of Ann Maurice: Interior Rivalry for the same channel in 2006 and 2007.

Personal life
She lives in San Francisco with her partner Timothy Budziak. She has two adult daughters and three grandchildren.

See also
 Wiki Books article on Home Staging

References

External links
 .
 Maurice versus Smith & Paul Associates for deregistration of 'House Doctor' as a trademark by the latter. Maurice won the case and costs.

British television presenters
American interior designers
American women journalists
American television personalities
American women television personalities
American expatriates in Mexico
American expatriates in the United Kingdom
People from Detroit
1951 births
Living people
American designers
American women interior designers
American women television presenters
21st-century American women